William A. Rowan (November 24, 1882 – May 31, 1961) of Chicago was an American politician who served as a U.S. Representative from Illinois from 1943 to 1947. He previously served as a member of the Chicago City Council from 1927 to 1942. He was a resident of Chicago's East Side community.

He graduated from St. Patrick Grade School and St. Patrick High School and attended the University of Chicago. He was employed in a steel plant after graduation. He was associated with a daily community newspaper in Chicago, becoming city editor and editor, 1907–1927.  William A. Rowan served as alderman of the Tenth Ward of Chicago from 1927 to 1942, and also as an Illinois Representative to The Seventy-Eighth and Seventy-Ninth U.S. Congresses. He was an unsuccessful candidate for reelection in 1946 to the Eightieth Congress. 

He was appointed United States Comptroller of Customs at Chicago, on January 21, 1947, in which capacity he served until 1953. While in office, he championed legislation aimed at improving the health, welfare, education, and recreational for children; a park serving East Side Chicago is dedicated in his honor.

Rowan was married to Mary Isabel Dunne, together they raised 5 children: Miriam, Richard, Patricia, and William Jr.  He was interred in Holy Sepulchre Cemetery, Worth, Illinois.

References

External links

 US House of Representatives. ROWAN, William A

1882 births
1961 deaths
University of Chicago alumni
Chicago City Council members
Democratic Party members of the United States House of Representatives from Illinois
20th-century American politicians